The 2014 World Field Archery Championships were held in Maksimir Park, Zagreb, Croatia.

Medal summary

Elite events

Junior events

References

Fie
2014 in Croatian sport
International archery competitions hosted by Croatia
Sports competitions in Zagreb
World Field Archery Championships
2010s in Zagreb
August 2014 sports events in Europe